The 2012 Kangaroo Cup was a professional tennis tournament played on hard courts. It was the sixteenth edition of the tournament which was part of the 2012 ITF Women's Circuit. It took place in Gifu, Japan between 30 April and 6 May 2012.

WTA entrants

Seeds

 1 Rankings are as of April 23, 2012.

Other entrants
The following players received wildcards into the singles main draw:
  Yurika Aoki
  Makoto Ninomiya
  Risa Ozaki
  Miki Ukai

The following players received entry from the qualifying draw:
  Shuko Aoyama
  Chan Chin-wei
  Sun Shengnan
  Zhou Yimiao

Champions

Singles

 Kimiko Date-Krumm def.  Noppawan Lertcheewakarn, 6–1, 5–7, 6–3

Doubles

 Jessica Pegula /  Zheng Saisai def.  Chan Chin-wei /  Hsu Wen-hsin, 6–4, 3–6, [10–4]

External links
ITF Search

Kangaroo Cup
Kangaroo Cup
2012 in Japanese tennis